Katri Lindeqvist (born 5 September 1980) is a Finnish orienteering competitor and world champion.

She received a gold medal in the relay at the 2008 World Orienteering Championships in Olomouc, together with Merja Rantanen and Minna Kauppi.

She participated on the Finnish team (with Merja Rantanen and Minna Kauppi) that achieved a bronze medal in the championship relay at the 2008 European Orienteering Championships in Ventspils.

See also
 Finnish orienteers
 List of orienteers
 List of orienteering events

References

External links

1980 births
Living people
Finnish orienteers
Female orienteers
Foot orienteers
World Orienteering Championships medalists